Hindu Munnani is a right-wing Hindu nationalist organisation based in the Indian state of Tamil Nadu. Hindu Munnani was set up by Rashtriya Swayamsevak Sangh (RSS) The organisation was founded in 1980 by Ramagopalan, a member of RSS and since its formation served as the platform for RSS and its subsidiaries known as the Sangh Parivar.

The organisation promoted a Hindu communal identity and used it as a political mobilisation strategy. The AIADMK government in the 1990s was in alliance with the Hindutva aligned Bharatiya Janata Party which enabled Hindu Munnani in organizing Vinayaka Chathurthi processions in major cities of Tamil Nadu. The state government's support of Rama Gopalan's activity made him a follower of Jayalalitha. Due to the proximity, a faction of the group broke away and found another group named Hindu Makkal Katchi in 1993. The militants of the Hindu Munnani used vituperative and abusive language against the Muslims. The provocative speeches against Islam and Prophet Muhammad polarized the social atmosphere of the region. Their anti-Muslim speeches and activities led to formation of Muslim group Al Umma.

The activities of R.S.S., Hindu Munnani and Hindu Makkal Katchi continued uninterrupted under Jayalalitha. The BJP alliance with AIADMK led to further spread of RSS ideology in Tamil Nadu. These organisations used religious festivals to combine their strength and caused riots.

Activities
The Hindu Munnani first gained public awareness in 1982 when it began to incite the Hindu population of Ramanathapuram district against the Meenakshipuram conversions by Ishaatul Islam Sabha of South India. 

However, the most remarkable achievement of the Hindu Munnani was the organisation of Vinayaka Chathurthi processions in Tamil Nadu. On 16 May 2006, the Hindu Munnani organised the Silver Jubilee celebrations of the installation of the shivalinga in the Jalakanteswarar temple in Vellore.

The Vinayaga Chathurthi celebrations organised by the Hindu Munnani were often accompanied by sporadic incidents of communal violence. In 1993, there were bomb attacks made on the R.S.S. state headquarters at Chintadripet, Chennai. Islamic organisations were found guilty for the blasts and a crackdown was launched on extremist Islamic organisations. 

1997 Coimbatore riots occurred between 29 November 1997 and 1 December 1997 in Coimbatore triggered by a murder of a police constable allegedly by some Muslim youth over a dispute of detention of Al-Ummah functionaries by the police. The policemen revolted in response to the murder of the constable and in concert with the members of Hindu Munnani and Hindu Makkal Katchi, attacked Muslims and Muslim-owned properties. Clashes erupted between both the communities and the police reportedly opened fire targeting the Muslims killing ten. Many Muslim youth were beaten to death or burnt alive. Muslim-owned businesses in different parts of the city were looted and burnt down. At the end of the riots, 18 Muslims and 2 Hindus lost their lives.

During the visit of Bharatiya Janata Party (BJP) leader L. K. Advani and Indian Prime Minister Atal Bihari Vajpayee to Coimbatore in 1998, a series of thirteen blasts rocked the city, killing over fifty-eight people. The Coimbatore bombings were considered a response to the 1997 Coimbatore riots.

In 2007, there were clashes between the Hindu Munnani and the Dravida Munnetra Kazhagam (DMK) over the remarks made by BJP leader Vedanti on DMK President and Chief Minister Karunanidhi. DMK cadres attacked the Hindu Munnani state headquarters in Chennai on motorbikes.

In September 2017, Six members of Hindu Munnani were arrested in connection with the murder of CPI member K. Kanagaraj in Virudhunagar district, Tamil Nadu.

In March 2020, Hindu Munnani attacked a mosque in Coimbatore during a communal tension.

Murders  
Thirukovilur Sundaram, In 1981, Hindu Munnani leader, Thirukovilur Sundaram was murdered at R. S. Puram in Coimbatore by Islamic fundamentalists.

S Vellaiappan, He was a senior leader of Hindu Munnani in Vellore. He was murdered by a gang of 8 people when he was headed towards Ramakrishna Math on his motorbike in July 2013.

K. P. S. Suresh Kumar, He was the president of the Hindu Munnani for Thiruvallur East district. He was originally from Kanyakumari. It is alleged that he was murdered by people from Al Ummah, an Islamic terrorist organisation, in June 2014. Three members were detained by the police in August 2014.

Jeevaraj, He was Hindu Munnani's Tirunelveli town secretary. He was murdered by his wife due to illicit adulterous relationship with other girl in July 2014.

C Sasikumar, A member in Coimbatore, A gang chased him on motorcycles and attacked him with sickles. He suffered injuries and died in Coimbatore Medical College and Hospital (CMCH).

See also

 P. Thanulinga Nadar

Notes

References
 K. Suryanarayana Rao (2002). The Story of R. S. S and Hindu Resurgence in Tamil Nadu

External links
Official Website Of Hindu Munnani

Anti-communist organizations
Anti-communism in India 
Anti-Christian sentiment in Asia
Anti-Islam sentiment in India 
Hinduism in Tamil Nadu
Hindu organizations
Hindu organisations based in India
Hindu paramilitary organizations
Volunteer organisations in India
Organisations based in Tamil Nadu
Religious organizations established in 1980
1980 establishments in Tamil Nadu
Sangh Parivar
Far-right politics in India
Hindu nationalism 
Hindutva
Religious organisations based in India